Comédie-Parisienne may refer to:
 Théâtre Antoine-Simone Berriau, a theatre in Paris which had the name in 1881
 Théâtre de l'Athénée, a theatre in Paris which had the name from 1893 to 1896